The 1899 Oklahoma Sooners football team represented the University of Oklahoma as an independent during the 1899 college football season. In their fifth year of football, and third year under head coach Vernon Louis Parrington, the Sooners compiled a 2–1 record, and outscored their opponents by a combined total of 61 to 28. This season was the first in which the team played a current NCAA Division I Football Bowl Subdivision opponent, Arkansas.

Schedule

References

Oklahoma
Oklahoma Sooners football seasons
Oklahoma Sooners football